Adireddy Bhavani (born ) is an Indian politician who is serving as a Member of the Andhra Pradesh Legislative Assembly since 2019 representing the Telugu Desam Party from the Rajahmundry City Constituency.

Early life 
Adireddy Bhavani is the daughter of former Union Minister Kinjarapu Yerran Naidu and sister of Ram Mohan Naidu Kinjarapu. She completed her Masters of Science from IILM University. She married Adireddy Srinivas, son of Adireddy Appa Rao, a Member of Legislative Council.

Political career 
Adireddy Bhavani contested the 2019 Andhra Pradesh Legislative Assembly election from Rajahmundry City Assembly constituency on behalf of Telugu Desam Party and won as the Member of the Legislative Assembly.

References 

1980s births
Living people
People from Rajahmundry
Telugu Desam Party politicians
Telugu people
Andhra Pradesh MLAs 2019–2024